The Blue Cut Fire was a wildfire in the Cajon Pass, northeastern San Gabriel Mountains, and Mojave Desert in San Bernardino County, California. The fire, which began on the Blue Cut hiking trail in the San Bernardino National Forest, was first reported on August 16, 2016 at 10:36 a.m., just west of Interstate 15.

By August 18, the fire had burned  of land and destroyed 105 homes and 213 other structures.

Fire progression
Shortly after the fire broke out, evacuations began to be ordered for the nearby communities of West Cajon Valley, Lytle Creek, Lone Pine Canyon and Swarthout Canyon.

Two firefighters were injured and briefly hospitalized on the morning of August 16, 2016 after becoming trapped while protecting homes in Swarthout Canyon.

These winds were causing the fire to spot upwards of a half mile (0.8 km) ahead of itself.

The evacuations affected an estimated 34,500 residences.

On Monday, August 22, fire officials said they had the fire 89% contained.

Fire officials declared that the devastating wildfire was fully contained on Tuesday, August 23. The fire destroyed an estimated 105 homes and 213 other structures in San Bernardino County, and now ranks as the 20th most destructive wildfire in state history, according to Daniel Berlant, a spokesman for the California Department of Forestry and Fire Protection.

Impacts 
Due to the rapid growth and spread of the fire, fire officials ordered mandatory evacuations for over 82,000 residents in surrounding communities, including Wrightwood. The Summit Inn, a historic U.S. Route 66 roadside diner built in 1952, was destroyed by the fire.

On Tuesday, August 16, 2016, Caltrans closed Interstate 15 through the Cajon Pass. This Interstate serves as the main route between Los Angeles and Las Vegas, Nevada.

Ten of the buildings belonging to the Thanksgiving Korean Church retreat in Phelan were destroyed by the fire. Another victim of the fire lost 135 of her livestock, and most of her property.

System stability of the electric power network 

As the fire approached a corridor of three 500 kV and two 287 kV transmission lines, 15 line faults in a short period of time occurred. The voltage drops and the disturbed frequency signal lead to significant losses of PV generation in the area, the most significant was nearly 1200 MW around 11:45 a.m.

See also
 2016 California wildfires
 2011–17 California drought
 Droughts in California
Fires in San Bernardino National Forest

References

2016 California wildfires
August 2016 events in the United States
History of the Mojave Desert region
Interstate 15
San Gabriel Mountains
Wildfires in San Bernardino County, California
San Bernardino National Forest